Blondie is the debut studio album by American rock band Blondie, released in December 1976 by Private Stock Records.

Overview
The first single "X Offender" was originally titled "Sex Offender", but since radio stations would not play a song with such a provocative title, the band renamed the song. After disappointing sales and poor publicity, the band ended their contract with Private Stock and signed with Chrysalis Records in mid 1977. Chrysalis re-released the album in September 1977, when they issued Blondie's 2nd album "Plastic Letters", along with the single "In the Flesh". The album reached No. 14 in Australia, where the band had already had a top-3 entry with "In the Flesh". The album also charted at No. 75 in the UK in early 1979, where the band had become immensely popular.

Through the production of Richard Gottehrer, who had worked with the Angels and other artists of the 1950s and 1960s, much of the music is suffused with the girl group sound of that era. Debbie Harry told an interviewer in 1978 that the band never intended to be retro and when some journalists described them that way, it was "quite a shock". Likewise she rejected any attempt to brand the music as pop, insisting that Blondie played new wave music.

The album was first digitally remastered by Chrysalis Records UK in 1994. In 2001, the album was again remastered and reissued, this time along with five bonus tracks. "Out in the Streets" (The Shangri-Las cover), "The Thin Line" and "Platinum Blonde" are three of five tracks from a 1975 demo recorded by Alan Betrock; all five were first issued on the 1994 compilation The Platinum Collection. Bonus track "Platinum Blonde" was the first song that Harry wrote. Original single versions of "X Offender" and "In the Sun" are both sides of Blondie's first single, issued on Private Stock, and are different mixes from the album versions. The two Private Stock versions are both remastered from vinyl.

Critical reception

Reviewing Blondie in 1977 for Rolling Stone, Ken Tucker called the album "a playful exploration of Sixties pop interlarded with trendy nihilism" and found that all the songs "work on at least two levels: as peppy but rough pop, and as distanced, artless avant-rock". He noted that Harry performed with "utter aplomb and involvement throughout: even when she's portraying a character consummately obnoxious and spaced-out, there is a wink of awareness that is comforting and amusing yet never condescending." He also noted that Harry was the "possessor of a bombshell zombie's voice that can sound dreamily seductive and woodenly Mansonite within the same song".

 Giovanni Dadomo of Sounds gave the album a two star rating, calling it a "pretty dumb affair" and that "nobody here seems to really be trying very hard.". Dadomo went on to state the production had " an almost totally bland lack of depth and colour" finding the main highlight to be "there's plenty of Farfisa and sometimes Blondie sounds a little bit like Jim Morrison."

In 2020, Rolling Stone included Blondie at number 401 on its list of the 500 greatest albums of all time.

Track listing

Personnel
Credits adapted from the liner notes of Blondie.

Blondie
 Deborah Harry – vocals
 Chris Stein – guitars, bass on "X Offender"
 Gary Valentine – bass guitar, guitar on "X Offender"
 Clement Burke – drums
 Jimmy Destri – Farfisa organ, grand piano, RMI piano, Roland synthesizer

Additional personnel

 Richard Gottehrer – production
 Rob Freeman – engineering
 Don Hunerberg – engineering assistance
 Greg Calbi – mastering at Sterling Sound (New York City)
 Ellie Greenwich – background vocals on "In the Flesh" and "Man Overboard"
 Micki Harris – background vocals on "In the Flesh" and "Man Overboard"
 Hilda Harris – background vocals on "In the Flesh" and "Man Overboard"
 Marty Thau – cocktail music
 Craig Leon – production ("X Offender", "In the Sun"); remix engineering
 David Perl – art direction, design
 Shig Ikeda – photography
 Alan Betrock – original producer of "Out in the Streets", "The Thin Line" and "Platinum Blonde"
 Kevin Flaherty – production (2001 reissue)

Charts

Certifications

References

Sources
 

1976 debut albums
Blondie (band) albums
Albums produced by Richard Gottehrer
Private Stock Records albums
Chrysalis Records albums
Albums produced by Craig Leon